Denis Stasyuk (September 2, 1985) is a Russian professional ice hockey winger who currently plays for Metallurg Novokuznetsk of the Kontinental Hockey League (KHL). He was selected by the Florida Panthers in the 6th round (171st overall) of the 2003 NHL Entry Draft.

Career statistics

References

External links

Living people
Metallurg Novokuznetsk players
1985 births
People from Novokuznetsk
Florida Panthers draft picks
Russian ice hockey forwards
Sportspeople from Kemerovo Oblast